Saint Margaret, St. Margarets, or St. Margaret's may refer to:

People
In chronological order:
 Saint Margaret the Virgin of Antioch (died 304)
 Saint Margaret of Scotland (c. 1045–1093)
 Saint Margaret of England (died 1192)
 Saint Margaret of Hungary (1242–1271)
 Saint Margaret of Cortona (1247–1297)
 Saint Margaret of Castello (1287-1320)
 Saint Margaret the Barefooted (1325–1395)
 Saint Rita of Cascia (1381–1457)
 Saint Margaret Clitherow (1556–1586)
 Saint Margaret Ward (died 1588)
 Saint Marguerite Marie Alacoque (1647–1690)
 Saint Teresa Margaret of the Sacred Heart (1747–1770)
 Saint Marguerite Bays (1815–1879)

Places and buildings
 Church of St Margaret of Scotland (disambiguation)
 St. Margaret, Belize, a village in Cayo District, Belize
 Saint Margaret Island, Victoria, Australia
 St. Margarets, New Brunswick, Canada
 St. Margaret's, Dublin, a town in Fingal, Ireland
 St. Margaret's Bay (disambiguation)
 St Margaret's Church (disambiguation)
 St Margaret's School (disambiguation)

United Kingdom
 Ilketshall St Margaret, Suffolk, England
 St Margaret South Elmham, Suffolk, England
 St Margarets, Herefordshire, a village and parish
 St Margarets, London
 St Margaret's at Cliffe, Kent
 St Margaret's Bus Station, Leicester, England
 St Margaret's Hope, Orkney Islands
 St Margaret's Ward, Ipswich, Suffolk
 Stanstead St Margarets, Hertfordshire

Other
 , a number of ships with this name
 St Margaret's GAA, a Gaelic football club in County Dublin, Ireland
 Great Barr Hall, former home of the St Margaret's Mental Hospital, Walsall, England
 Society of Saint Margaret, order of women in the Anglican Church

See also
 Margaret (disambiguation)
 Sainte-Marguerite (disambiguation)
 Santa Margherita (disambiguation)
 Santa Margarita (disambiguation)
 Santa Margarida (disambiguation)